George Mason Stadium is a 5,000-seat stadium in Fairfax, Virginia on the campus of George Mason University. It serves as the home to George Mason's soccer and lacrosse teams.  

The stadium hosted the first home game for the Washington Bayhawks as a Washington, D.C.-based franchise on May 12, 2007, with other games placed at Georgetown's Multi-Sport Field. In 2008, George Mason Stadium hosted all but one Bayhawks home game.

References

External links
 Venue information

George Mason Patriots soccer
Sports venues in Virginia
Sports venues in the Washington metropolitan area
Soccer venues in Virginia
Lacrosse venues in the United States
Former Major League Lacrosse venues
George Mason Patriots lacrosse
College soccer venues in the United States
College lacrosse venues in the United States
College track and field venues in the United States
George Mason Patriots track and field